The Panhandle Plains Wildlife Trail is a state-designated system of trails and wildlife sanctuaries in the Texas Panhandle in the United States. It is one of the four major wildlife trail systems designated by the State of Texas.

The trail system forms a loop that runs from Abilene to Lubbock and Amarillo, around to Canadian and Shamrock, and back to Abilene.

Notes

External links
 Panhandle Plains Wildlife Trail (PHP)

Hiking trails in Texas
Protected areas of Texas
Protected areas of Taylor County, Texas
Protected areas of Jones County, Texas
Protected areas of Lubbock County, Texas
Protected areas of Potter County, Texas
Protected areas of Hemphill County, Texas
Protected areas of Wheeler County, Texas
Birdwatching sites in the United States